Andrej Martin (born 20 September 1989, in Bratislava) is an inactive Slovak professional tennis player. He achieved his career-high ATP singles ranking of world No. 93 in February 2020.

Career

2016: Best season: French Open third round, first ATP final, top 100 debut
He was a lucky loser at the French Open and defeated Daniel Muñoz de la Nava in the first round of the main draw and 29th seed Lucas Pouille in the second, before losing to 8th-seed Milos Raonic in the third round.

In July 2016, Martin reached first ATP final, in Umag, defeated Martin Klizan, Joao Sousa, Carlos Berlocq and Sergiy Stakhovsky en route. In the final he lost to Italian No. 1 Fabio Fognini.

Later in the year, Martin participated in the 2016 Summer Olympics. After comfortably defeating Denis Kudla in the first round, Martin got a walkover into the 3rd round when opponent Philipp Kohlschreiber withdrew with an injury. However, Martin was then beaten by the 4th-seeded Kei Nishikori, 2–6, 2–6.

He achieved a career-high ATP singles ranking of world No. 98 in July 2016 following his runs to the third round of the French Open and the final in Umag.

2020: Career-high singles ranking 
He reached a career-high ranking of No. 93 on 10 February 2020 after a semifinal showing at the 2020 Córdoba Open defeating Corentin Moutet in the quarterfinals before losing to eventual champion Cristian Garin.

2021: Australian Open debut, ATP semifinal & loss to World No. 1 
He made his main draw debut at the 2021 Australian Open where he lost to Thiago Monteiro (tennis).

At the 2021 Belgrade Open he lost to top seed and World No. 1 and eventual champion Novak Djokovic in the semifinals.

Grand Slam performance timelines

Singles

Doubles

ATP career finals

Singles: 1 (1 runner-up)

Doubles: 1 (1 runner-up)

Challenger and Futures finals

Singles: 34 (22 titles, 12 runner-ups)

Doubles: 39 (23 titles, 16 runner-ups)

Top-10 wins per season

Notes

References

External links
 
 
 
 
 

1989 births
Living people
Tennis players from Bratislava
Slovak male tennis players
Tennis players at the 2016 Summer Olympics
Olympic tennis players of Slovakia